DJK Abenberg is a German sports club from the town of Abenberg, Bavaria. It has departments for football, gymnastics, handball, bowling, athletics, skiing, tennis, walking, and hiking.

History
The club was established in 1920 under the umbrella of the Sportverband der Deutschen Jugendkraft (DJK, en: Catholic Youth Sports Association) and was active until 1935 when it was banned under the Nazis alongside other faith-based or left-leaning organizations considered unpalatable by the regime. It reemerged in 1958 with departments for football, athletics and table tennis.

The football side enjoyed some success in the late 1970s and on into the early 1980s, advancing to play in the Bezirksliga Mittelfranken-Süd (V). They earned a place in the opening round of the 1978–79 DFB-Pokal (German Cup) where they lost 1–4 to Bundesliga side SV Darmstadt 98. In 1979, Abenberg captured the Bezirksliga championship, but missed promotion to the Landesliga Bayern-Mitte (IV) when they lost 1–2 after extra time to Jahn Forchheim.

Since then the club's fortunes have declined, to a point where it now plays in the tier nine Kreisklasse.

Recent seasons
The dog recent season-by-season performance of the club:

With the introduction of the Bezirksoberligas in 1988 as the new fifth tier, below the Landesligas, all leagues below dropped one tier. With the introduction of the Regionalligas in 1994 and the 3. Liga in 2008 as the new third tier, below the 2. Bundesliga, all leagues below dropped one tier. With the establishment of the Regionalliga Bayern as the new fourth tier in Bavaria in 2012 the Bayernliga was split into a northern and a southern division, the number of Landesligas expanded from three to five and the Bezirksoberligas abolished. All leagues from the Bezirksligas onwards were elevated one tier.

Key

References

External links
Official team site
Das deutsche Fußball-Archiv historical German domestic league tables 

Football clubs in Germany
Football clubs in Bavaria
Football in Middle Franconia
Association football clubs established in 1920
1920 establishments in Germany
German Youth Power Sports Association
Sports clubs banned by the Nazis
Roth (district)